Gérard Paul Philippe Wertheimer (born 17 April 1951) is a French billionaire businessman based in New York City and Geneva, who owns Chanel in partnership with his brother, Alain. As of October 2022, Wertheimer's net worth was estimated at US$40 billion by Bloomberg Billionaires Index, making him the 27th richest person in the world.

Biography
Wertheimer was born to a Jewish family, the son of Jacques Wertheimer and Eliane Fischer. His grandfather, Pierre, co-founded Chanel with Coco Chanel. The company is run by Alain Wertheimer who has presided over the acquisition of several non-Chanel brands, including Eres Lingerie, Tanner Krolle saddles and leather goods, and Holland & Holland, a British gunsmith. Based in France, the Wertheimer brothers own French vineyards including Château Rauzan-Ségla in Margaux and Château Canon in Saint-Emilion, both of which have won rave reviews from oenophiles. Both brothers are enthusiastic equestrians who also inherited and operate an important thoroughbred horse racing stable they call La Presle Farm and/or Wertheimer farm for racing in the United States and in France as Wertheimer et Frère partnership.

Gérard's wife Valérie is active in child protection charities.

Personal life
Wertheimer is married, with two children, and lives in New York City and Switzerland.

He has had two daughters with his second wife named Paloma and Olivia 

Gérard and his brother own vineyards in France and Napa Valley, California.

See also 
 List of billionaires

References

External links
 Times on line
 Horse breeders cup 2003

French businesspeople in fashion
1950 births
Living people
Chanel people
French billionaires
French racehorse owners and breeders
20th-century French Jews
20th-century French businesspeople
21st-century French businesspeople
Wertheimer family